Karl Wilhelm Friedrich August Leopold Graf von Werder (12 September 1808 – 12 September 1887) was a Prussian general.

Life and career

Early life and assignments 
Werder was born in Schloßberg near Norkitten in the Province of East Prussia. He entered the Prussian Gardes du Corps in 1825, transferring the following year into the Guard Infantry, with which he served for many years as a subaltern. In 1839 he was appointed an instructor in the Cadet Corps, and later he was employed in the topographical bureau of the Great General Staff. In 1842-1843 he took part in the Russian operations in the Caucasus, and on his return to Germany in 1846, was placed, as a captain, on the staff. In 1848 he married. Regimental and staff duty alternately occupied him until 1863, when he was made major-general, and given the command of a brigade of Guard Infantry.

Command in the wars against Denmark and France 
In the Austro-Prussian War of 1866, Werder commanded the 3rd Division, which was part of the Second Army. Despite a lack of supply, Werder distinguished himself at Gitschin and Königgratz. He returned home with the rank of lieutenant-general and the Order Pour le Mérite. In 1870, at first employed with the 3rd Army Headquarters and in command of the Württemberg and Baden forces, he was after the Battle of Wörth entrusted with the operations against Strasbourg, which he captured after a long and famous siege.

Promoted general of infantry, and assigned to command the new XIVth Army Corps, Werder defeated the French at Dijon and at Nuits, and, when Charles-Denis Bourbaki's army moved forward to relieve Belfort, turned upon him and fought the desperate action of Battle of Villersexel, which enabled him to cover the Germans besieging Belfort. On 15, 16 and 17 January 1871, Werder with greatly inferior forces succeeded in holding his own on the Battle of the Lisaine against all Bourbaki's efforts to reach Belfort, a victory which aroused great enthusiasm in southern Germany. In the course of this enthusiastic prevailing mood, a monument - the Siegesdenkmal - was erected in Freiburg im Breisgau to honor his services and the victory of the German people in the Franco-Prussian War.

Retirement 
After the war Werder commanded the Baden forces, now called the XlVth Army Corps, until he retired in 1879. On his retirement he was raised to the dignity of count. He died in 1887 at Grüssow in Pomerania. The 30th (4th Rhenish) Infantry regiment carried his name, and there is a statue of Werder at Freiburg im Breisgau.

Honours and awards

Notes

References

1808 births
1887 deaths
People from East Prussia
Generals of Infantry (Prussia)
Counts of Germany
German military personnel of the Franco-Prussian War
Prussian people of the Austro-Prussian War
Recipients of the Grand Cross of the Iron Cross
Recipients of the Pour le Mérite (military class)
Grand Crosses of the Military Merit Order (Bavaria)
Recipients of the Military Merit Cross (Mecklenburg-Schwerin), 1st class
Recipients of the Order of St. Vladimir, 4th class
Recipients of the Order of St. George of the Third Degree